Open-source robotics (OSR) is where the physical artifacts of the subject are offered by the open design movement. This branch of robotics makes use of open-source hardware and free and open-source software providing blueprints, schematics, and source code. The term usually means that information about the hardware is easily discerned so that others can make it from standard commodity components and tools—coupling it closely to the maker movement and open science.

Advantages
 Long-term availability. Many non-open robots and components, especially at the hobbyist level, are designed and sold by tiny startups which can disappear overnight, leaving customers without support.  Open-source systems are guaranteed to have their designs available forever so communities of users can, and do, continue support after the manufacturer has disappeared.
 Avoiding lock-in.  A company relying on any particular non-open component exposes itself to business risk that the supplier could ratchet up prices after they have invested time and technology building on it.  Open hardware can be manufacturered by anyone, creating competition or at least the potential for competition, which both remove this risk.
 Interchangeable software and/or hardware with common interfaces.
 Ability to modify and fork designs more easily for customisation, innovation, collaboration and extension.
 Higher independence, sovereignty and security as well as lower risks for unknown built-in backdoors or surveillance compared to closed-source robots.
 Scientific reproducibility - guarantees that other labs can replicate and extend work, leading to increased impact, citations and reputation for the designer.
 Lower-cost. Costs of a robot can be decreased dramatically when all components and tools are commodities. No component seller can hold a project to ransom by ratcheting the price of a critical component, as competing suppliers can easily be interchanged.

Drawbacks

 For commercial organisations, open-sourcing their own designs obviously means they can no longer make large profits through the traditional engineering business model of acting as the monopoly manufacturer or seller, because the open design can be manufactured and sold by anyone including direct competitors.    Profit from engineering can come from three main sources:  design, manufacturing, and support.   As with other open source business models, commercial designers typically make profit via their association with the brand, which may still be trademarked.  A valuable brand allows them to command a premium for their own manufactured products, as it can be associated with high quality and provide a quality guarantee to customers.  The same brand is also used to command a premium on associated services, such as providing installation, maintenance, and integration support for the product. Again customers will typically pay more for the knowledge that this support is provided directly by the original designer, who therefore knows the product better than competitors.
 Some customers associate open source with amateurism, the hacker community, low quality and poor support.  Serious companies using this business model may need to work harder to overcome this perception by emphasising their professionalism and brand to differentiate themselves from amateur efforts.
 ...

Examples

This is a non-exhaustive list of open source robots: Plen2 Eiro robot Poppy Complete humanoïd robot inmoov Molecubes, 'Quad-SDK' for large agile four-legged robots (compatible with the ROS), and the quadcopter-drone system Agilicious

ROS

Popularity
A first sign of the increasing popularity of building robots yourself can be found with the DIY community. What began with small competitions for remote operated vehicles (e.g. Robot combat), soon developed to the building of autonomous telepresence robots as Sparky and then true robots (being able to take decisions themselves) as the Open Automaton Project and Leaf Project. Certain commercial companies now also produce kits for making simple robots.

A recurring problem in the community has been projects, especially on Kickstarter, promising to fully open-source their hardware and then reneging on this promise once funded, in order to profit from being the sole manufacturer and seller.

Applications
Popular applications to date include:

 Laboratory robotics (various applications)
 Domestic tasks: vacuum cleaning, floor washing and automated mowing.
 The use of RepRaps and other 3-D printers for rapid prototyping, art, toy manufacturing, educational aides, and open-source appropriate technology
 metalworks automation
 building electronic circuitry (printing and component placing of PCB-boards)
 transportation, i.e. self-driving vehicles
 combat robots, including manual controlled and autonomous contests
 Education
 3D photogrammetry

See also

How-to
Internet of Things
Khepera mobile robot III
Maker culture
Modular design
Open-source computing hardware
OpenStructures
Robot software
Robotics suite
Standardization
Timeline of computing 2020–present

References

 
Robotics